Zarechnaya Sloboda is a rural locality (a selo) in Sosnovoborsky Selsoviet of Zeysky District, Amur Oblast, Russia. The population was 653 as of 2018. There are 11 streets.

Geography 
Zarechnaya Sloboda is located on the left bank of the Zeya River, 10 km south of Zeya (the district's administrative centre) by road. Zeya is the nearest rural locality.

References 

Rural localities in Zeysky District